WEC 35: Condit vs. Miura was a mixed martial arts event held by World Extreme Cagefighting that took place on August 3, 2008 at the Hard Rock Hotel and Casino in Paradise, Nevada. The event drew an estimated 423,000 viewers on Versus. The event featured three title fights, the first time a Zuffa, LLC promoted MMA card featured more than two title fights on the same card since UFC 33 in 2001; there would not be another UFC event with more than two until UFC 205 in 2016, after Zuffa had sold the promotion.

Background
A featherweight bout between Cub Swanson and Hiroyuki Takaya was originally scheduled for this event, but Swanson pulled out due to a broken hand. Promotional newcomer LC Davis had verbally agreed to replace Swanson, but Takaya did not approve the new matchup, and the bout was removed from the card. The Swanson/Takaya bout was rescheduled for WEC 37 in December 2008, where Swanson won by unanimous decision.

Results

Bonus awards 
Fighters were awarded $7,500 bonuses.

Fight of the Night:  Carlos Condit vs.  Hiromitsu Miura
Knockout of the Night:  Brock Larson
Submission of the Night:  Brian Bowles

Reported payout 
The following is the reported payout to the fighters as reported to the Nevada State Athletic Commission. It does not include sponsor money or "locker room" bonuses often given by the WEC.

Carlos Condit: $44,000 (includes $22,000 win bonus) def. Hiromitsu Miura: $5,000 
Steve Cantwell: $10,000 ($5,000 win bonus) def. Brian Stann: $11,000 
Jamie Varner: $30,000 ($15,000 win bonus) def. Marcus Hicks: $16,000 
Brian Bowles: $8,000 ($4,000 win bonus) def. Damacio Page: $6,000 
Josh Grispi: $8,000 ($4,000 win bonus) def. Micah Miller: $5,000 
Brock Larson: $30,000 ($15,000 win bonus) def. Carlo Prater: $7,000 
Blas Avena: $12,000 ($6,000 win bonus) def. Dave Terrel: $3,000 
Shane Roller: $12,000 ($6,000 win bonus) def. Todd Moore: $4,000 
Mike Budnik: $6,000 ($3,000 win bonus) def. Greg McIntyre: $2,000 
Scott Jorgensen: $6,000 ($3,000 win bonus) def. Kenji Osawa: $5,000

See also 
 World Extreme Cagefighting
 List of World Extreme Cagefighting champions
 List of WEC events
 2008 in WEC

External links
Official WEC website

References

World Extreme Cagefighting events
2008 in mixed martial arts
Mixed martial arts in Las Vegas
2008 in sports in Nevada
Hard Rock Hotel and Casino (Las Vegas)